Palliser Pass, is a mountain pass in the Canadian Rockies, located on the British Columbia / Alberta boundary at the south end of Banff National Park and at the north end of Height of the Rockies Provincial Park in British Columbia. The pass is located north of the headwaters of the Palliser River.

Name origin 
See Palliser Expedition.

References 

Banff National Park
Mountain passes of British Columbia
Mountain passes of Alberta
Canadian Rockies